The Nokia 5310 is an XpressMusic mobile phone, introduced by Nokia on 29 August 2007 and released in the fourth quarter of 2007. It is less than a centimeter thick and is available with blue, red, purple, pink, orange, silver or black trim, the main body also being available in grey, black or white. It features many music specific features as well as a 2.0-megapixel camera. At 9.9 mm thick, it is one of few mobile phones measuring less than 1 cm thick at the time. It is one of the lightest phones Nokia has ever produced at 71 g.

On 19 March 2020, HMD Global released a reimagining of the phone, the Nokia 5310 (2020).

Features
The phone has basic organizer functions including a calendar, to-do list, and notes. All of these plus the phonebook can be synchronized with a desktop calendar such as iCal over Bluetooth. As a music-oriented phone, it comes with a dedicated audio chip, which delivers better audio quality, as well as 3 music buttons: Play, Next Track and Previous Track. These buttons can activate the music player on the phone during almost all other activities, such as sending text messages and changing settings. With the included headset it can play FM radio and receive calls with the headset's button.  The 5310 also has WAP 2.0/xHTML, as well as HTML capabilities.

Specification sheet

Related handsets 
 Nokia 5130 XpressMusic
 Nokia 5220 XpressMusic
 Nokia 5610 XpressMusic
 Nokia 5630 XpressMusic
 Nokia 5300 XpressMusic
 Nokia 5800 XpressMusic
 Nokia 5310 (2020)

References

External links 
 Official product page 
 Official technical specifications 
 Featured in PCWorld.ca's round-up of Top Canadian Smartphones and Cell Phones

5310
Mobile phones introduced in 2007
Mobile phones with user-replaceable battery